Ovidiu Lucian Cuc  (born 14 January 1973) is a Romanian retired professional football player.

Aside from playing in his native home of Romania, Cuc played the majority of his career abroad, most notably in Portugal where he played for Chaves, Santa Clara, Gil Vicente, Famalicão and Ataense.

Cuc was part of the Romanian under-16 national team who played in the 1989 UEFA European Under-16 Championship.

In October 2022, he became president of Poli Timisoara.

Honours

Club 
Mérida
Segunda División: 1994–95

FC Anzhi Makhachkala
Russian Second Division: 1999

Poli Timisoara
Liga II: 2001–02
Cupa Romaniei: runner-up 2006–07

References

External links

 
 Stats and profile at Zerozero

1973 births
Living people
Sportspeople from Timișoara
Romanian footballers
Association football forwards
FC Politehnica Timișoara players
CP Mérida footballers
CA Marbella footballers
G.D. Chaves players
C.D. Santa Clara players
Gil Vicente F.C. players
F.C. Ashdod players
F.C. Famalicão players
Liga I players
Segunda División players
Primeira Liga players
Liga Portugal 2 players
Israeli Premier League players
Liga II players
Romania youth international footballers
Romanian expatriate footballers
Expatriate footballers in Spain
Expatriate footballers in Portugal
Expatriate footballers in Israel
Romanian expatriate sportspeople in Spain
Romanian expatriate sportspeople in Portugal
Romanian expatriate sportspeople in Israel